Anton Hermann Benning (15 May 1918 – 29 September 2013) was a German Luftwaffe ace and recipient of the Knight's Cross of the Iron Cross during World War II.

Career
Benning joined the Luftwaffe in 1938 and was initially posted as a flying instructor. As a transport pilot flying the Junkers Ju 52, he took part in supplying the Stalingrad pocket in early 1943, before retraining as a single engined fighter pilot with Jagdgeschwader 106 (JG 106). In June 1943 Oberfeldwebel Benning was transferred to 2./Jagdgeschwader 301 (JG 301) to operate as a "Wilde Sau" night fighter. He was transferred to 2./Jagdgeschwader 302 (JG 302) as a Leutnant, before becoming Staffelkapitän of 10./JG 301 in late 1944.

He received the Ritterkreuz on 13 April 1945.

Benning was credited with 28 victories (inc. 18 four engined bombers, of which 3 were RAF Lancasters), all on the Western Front.

He studied dentistry in Hamburg, Germany, and started a dental office in Marl, Germany. He was well known as the „flying dentist“ in his area. Both of his sons became pilots as well. 

After his death in 2013 a place at the Marl-Loemühle airfield was named after him where he was a founding member.  The "Toni Benning Square".

Death
He died 29 September 2013, aged 95 in Recklinghausen.

Awards
 Flugzeugführerabzeichen
 Iron Cross (1939)
 2nd Class (1 September 1940)
 1st Class (31 January 1942)
 German Cross in Gold on 1 January 1945 as Oberfeldwebel in the 2./Jagdgeschwader 302.
 Knight's Cross of the Iron Cross on 13 April 1945 as Leutnant and Staffelkapitän of the 1./Jagdgeschwader 301

References

Citations

Bibliography

External links
TracesOfWar.com
Ritterkreuztraeger 1939-1945

1918 births
2013 deaths
Luftwaffe pilots
German World War II flying aces
Recipients of the Gold German Cross
Recipients of the Knight's Cross of the Iron Cross
People from Havelland
People from the Province of Brandenburg
Military personnel from Brandenburg